Aleksandr Sergeyevich Klyuyev (born 3 January 1981) is a former Russian professional football player.

Club career
He played 3 seasons in the Russian Football National League for FC Dynamo Bryansk.

External links
 

1981 births
People from Novorossiysk
Living people
Russian footballers
FC Zhemchuzhina Sochi players
FC Chernomorets Novorossiysk players
Association football defenders
FC Arsenal Tula players
FC Dynamo Bryansk players
FC Spartak Kostroma players
Sportspeople from Krasnodar Krai